

In the Baháʼí Faith the Qiblih ("direction") is the location to which Baháʼís face when saying their daily obligatory prayers.

In Bábism the Qiblih was originally identified by the Báb with "the One Whom God will make manifest",  a messianic figure predicted by the Báb. Baháʼu'lláh, the Prophet-founder of the Baháʼí Faith claimed to be the figure predicted by the Báb. In the Kitáb-i-Aqdas, Baháʼu'lláh confirms the Báb's ordinance and further ordains his final resting-place as the Qiblih for his followers. ʻAbdu'l-Bahá describes that spot as the "luminous Shrine", "the place around which circumambulate the Concourse on High". The concept exists in other religions. Jews face Jerusalem, more specifically the site of the former Temple of Jerusalem. Muslims face the Kaaba in Mecca, which they also call the Qibla (another transliteration of Qiblih).

Baháʼís do not worship the Shrine of Baháʼu'lláh or its contents, the Qiblih is simply a focal point for the obligatory prayers. When praying obligatory prayers the members of the Baháʼí Faith face in the direction of the Qiblih. It is a fixed requirement for the recitation of an obligatory prayer, but for other prayers and devotions one may follow what is written in the Qurʼan: "Whichever way ye turn, there is the face of God."

Burial of the dead
"The dead should be buried with their face turned towards the Qiblih. This also is in accordance with what is practiced in Islam. There is also a congregational prayer to be recited. Besides this there is no other ceremony to be performed" (From a letter written on behalf of Shoghi Effendi to an individual believer, July 6, 1935).

See also
Qibla, the Islamic equivalent of the Qiblih
Ad orientem, the Christian practice of facing east in prayer, also informs orientation of many church building
Mizrah, the Jewish practice of praying facing the Temple Mount in Jerusalem

Citations

References

External links
Excerpts from the Kitáb-i-Aqdas regarding the Qiblih
Direction to Bahjí
Find the direction to Bahji with Google Maps

Bahá'í prayer
Orientation (geometry)

fr:Qiblih